Albert is a provincial electoral district for the Legislative Assembly of New Brunswick, Canada.  It was created in 1973 when New Brunswick moved to single member districts and the former multi-member riding of Albert was split into this riding and the new riding of Riverview.

The boundaries were expanded slightly in the 1994 redistribution, taking in a small part of Riverview and again in 2006 when it took in another small part of the town of Riverview.  In the 2013 redistribution it added more of Riverview again, as well as the Village of Salisbury.

Members of the Legislative Assembly

Election results

References

External links 
Website of the Legislative Assembly of New Brunswick
Map of riding as of 2018
New Brunswick Votes 2006, CBC

New Brunswick provincial electoral districts